Mauidrillia costifer is an extinct species of sea snail, a marine gastropod mollusk in the family Horaiclavidae.

Description
The length of the shell varies between 7 and 8 mm. The snail's body color is basically pale, with a long, slender proboscis that they used for feeding and mating. The eyes of the snail are located at the base of the tentacles and are usually not visible from the outside. Mauidrillia costifer is comparatively small, usually measuring less than 2 cm in length, although individuals can different in size depending on factors such as age, habitat, and food availability.

Distribution
This extinct marine species is endemic to New Zealand

References

 Suter, Henry. Descriptions of New Tertiary Mollusca Occurring in New Zealand Part I. 1917.
 Maxwell, P.A. (2009). Cenozoic Mollusca. pp. 232–254 in Gordon, D.P. (ed.) New Zealand inventory of biodiversity. Volume one. Kingdom Animalia: Radiata, Lophotrochozoa, Deuterostomia. Canterbury University Press, Christchurch

External links
 Revised descriptions of New Zealand Cenozoic Mollusca from Beu and Maxwell (1990): Mauidrillia costifer

costifer
Gastropods described in 1917